John Marvin is an English-Filipino amateur boxer who is a native of the Isle of Wight in England. He has represented the Philippines in boxing internationally.

Boxing career

Early career
In 2010, Marvin used to fight with others after school for fun but the police had to intervene in one fight and Marvin was told to take up his fight to a boxing gym. He joined the Ventnor Club and trained under coach Darren Green.

He later joined the military where he further pursued boxing. After winning the Army Individuals Championship where he knocked out his semifinals and finals opponents in the second round, he was invited to the boxing team of the British Army in 2014. By August 2017, he is a two-time Combined Services Senior Boxing champion and had an amateur record of 23 wins, 11 of which are by knockouts, and 11 losses.

International career
He met up with members of the Philippine boxing team in 2016 in a boxing show in Sweden or Finland. Upon mentioning his Filipino heritage, Marvin was told he could represent the country if he holds dual citizenship. He acquired Filipino citizenship and became eligible to box for the country. There is a lack of national boxers fighting in the welterweight to light heavyweight division in the Philippines and it helped that Marvin fights in the light heavyweight division. Marvin is the first Filipino with foreign heritage absorbed to the Philippine national team since Christopher Camat, who competed at the 2004 Summer Olympics.

He went to Guangzhou in July 2017 to train with his countrymen along with Chinese, Kazakh, and South Korean boxers before competing at the 2017 Southeast Asian Games. He won a gold medal at the Games by winning over Adli Hafidz Mohamad Pauzi of Malaysia 21 seconds into the gold medal match.

Military career
As of 2017, he holds the rank, Lance Corporal in the British Army and is assigned to the Royal Regiment of Wales.

Personal life
Marvin was born to John Sr., a British retired professional singer, former cruise director and a yacht master, and Teresita Tupas, a Filipina who is native to Pampanga. He has a younger brother who is with the merchant navy. During his childhood, he made frequent visits to his mother's homeland with his family until around 2006. He would visit the Philippines again in 2017 when he joined the national boxing team of the country.
in January 2021 he appeared before the Isle of Wight magistrates court and was given a suspended sentence and convicted of ABH and beating up women. https://www.countypress.co.uk/news/19036581.isle-wight-army-boxer-spared-jail-string-assaults/

References

Royal Regiment of Wales soldiers
Year of birth missing (living people)
Living people
Filipino male boxers
English male boxers
Princess of Wales's Royal Regiment soldiers
Southeast Asian Games medalists in boxing
Southeast Asian Games gold medalists for the Philippines
Competitors at the 2017 Southeast Asian Games
Light-heavyweight boxers